Toshirō Suga (born  August 22, 1950) is a Japanese aikido instructor.  He holds the rank of 7th dan Aikikai.

Born in Tokyo, his aikido teachers include Morihei Ueshiba and Morihiro Saito. For many years, he taught military forces in Canada. He takes part in international seminars.

He had a brief career in cinema, thanks in part to his student Michael G. Wilson, where his best known part was as Chang in the 1979 James Bond film Moonraker.

He currently lives in Paris.

Martial arts training 
Toshirô Suga started judo at age 15 in the Tokyo police force dojo. At the age of 17 (1968), guided by his father's advice, he  began Aikido in the Aikikai Hombu Dojo in Tokyo. For the following year and a half, he had the daily teaching of Morihei Ueshiba during the 15h00 class of Sadateru Arikawa sensei.

He also attended the daily classes of Mitsugi Saotome, Akira Tohei, Yasuo Kobayashi,  Tohei Koichi, Kisshōmaru Ueshiba and Morihiro Saito.

Toshirô Suga arrived in France during the summer 1971 and met Nobuyoshi Tamura sensei.

He is now in working (Chargé d'Enseignement National) with the FFAB, and is 7th dan (7. Dan Aikikai Tokyo). He gives his teaching all year long in his dojo and during seminar around the world.

Teaching aikido in France 
From 1980 to 1985 his first class as a teacher was in Saint-Brieuc : Club de Saint Brieuc
From 1985 to 1989 he went to Canada where he taught aïkido to the army.
From 1989 to 2002 He taught in Brest : Dojo Shobukan de Brest
Since 2002: ASH Aïkido à Herblay & Aïkido club Boisséen

Movies 
 Acting 
 Moonraker, Lewis Gilbert, 1979 : Chang
 Tout dépend des filles..., Pierre Fabre, 1980 : Takashi
 Le Bouffon (TV), Guy Jorré, 1981 : the Japanese
 Charlots connection, Jean Couturier, 1984 :

Aikido DVDs 
 Ken, les racines de l'aïkido, 2006
 Jo, le pilier de l'aïkido
 Les Fondements de l'aïkido

External links 

Site perso
Article : Toshiro Suga, l'Aïkido sans concessions (French)
Article : Toshiro Suga, le combat contre soi-même (French)
une pratique de l’existence (French)

Short bio (French)
bio on the FFAB site

Japanese aikidoka
Japanese expatriates in France
People from Tokyo
Living people
1950 births
20th-century Japanese male actors